This article concerns the period 29 BC – 20 BC.

Significant people
 Caesar Augustus, Roman Emperor (27 BC–AD 14)

References